France was represented by Martine Clemenceau, with the song "Sans toi", at the 1973 Eurovision Song Contest, which took place on 7 April in Luxembourg City. "Sans toi" was chosen as the French entry at the national final on 6 March.

Before Eurovision

National final 
The national final was organised by broadcaster ORTF and held at the Buttes-Chaumont TV studios in Paris. Six songs took part with the winner chosen by three juries made up of "experts", press and members of the public. Anne-Marie Godart had represented Monaco in the 1972 contest.

At Eurovision 
On the night of the final Clemenceau performed 16th in the running order, following the United Kingdom and preceding Israel. At the close of voting "Sans toi" had received 65 points, placing France joint 15th (with Yugoslavia) of the 17 entries – the only time that France finished outside the top 10 during the 1970s. Finished tied second-last was the nearest to last result for France from 1956 to 1997.

Voting

References 

1973
Countries in the Eurovision Song Contest 1973
Eurovision